Vlčkovce (until 1948: Farkašín) is a village and municipality of Trnava District in the Trnava Region of Slovakia.

References

External links

 http://en.e-obce.sk/obec/vlckovce/vlckovce.html
 http://www.statistics.sk/mosmis/eng/run.html
 Official page 

Villages and municipalities in Trnava District